Williams Township is a township in Dauphin County, Pennsylvania, United States. The population was 1,063 at the 2020 census.

Williams Township was named for a family of pioneer settlers.

Geography
The township is in northeastern Dauphin County and is bordered to the northeast by Schuylkill County. The borough of Williamstown, a separate municipality, is in the southern part of the township.

Demographics

As of the census of 2000, there were 1,135 people, 454 households, and 337 families residing in the township.  The population density was 129.3 people per square mile (49.9/km).  There were 504 housing units at an average density of 57.4/sq mi (22.2/km).  The racial makeup of the township was 98.41% White, 0.18% African American, 0.26% Native American, 0.26% from other races, and 0.88% from two or more races. Hispanic or Latino of any race were 0.88% of the population.

There were 454 households, out of which 30.4% had children under the age of 18 living with them, 59.5% were married couples living together, 9.7% had a female householder with no husband present, and 25.6% were non-families. 23.3% of all households were made up of individuals, and 11.9% had someone living alone who was 65 years of age or older.  The average household size was 2.50 and the average family size was 2.91.

In the township the population was spread out, with 23.3% under the age of 18, 7.2% from 18 to 24, 29.2% from 25 to 44, 25.9% from 45 to 64, and 14.4% who were 65 years of age or older.  The median age was 39 years. For every 100 females, there were 106.0 males.  For every 100 females age 18 and over, there were 98.4 males.

The median income for a household in the township was $41,029, and the median income for a family was $46,250. Males had a median income of $32,331 versus $25,625 for females. The per capita income for the township was $17,656.  About 7.6% of families and 8.9% of the population were below the poverty line, including 8.7% of those under age 18 and 17.7% of those age 65 or over.

References

External links
Williams Township official website

Harrisburg–Carlisle metropolitan statistical area
Townships in Dauphin County, Pennsylvania
Townships in Pennsylvania